Kyle Martin Chandler (born September 17, 1965) is an American actor. Making his screen acting debut in a 1988 television film, Quiet Victory: The Charlie Wedemeyer Story, Chandler's first regular television role was in the ABC drama Homefront (1991–93). This was followed by the lead role of Gary Hobson in the CBS series Early Edition (1996–2000), for which he won a Saturn Award for Best Actor on Television. His other television roles include the sitcom What About Joan? (2001) and the legal drama The Lyon's Den (2003), both short-lived, and a well-received guest appearance on the medical drama Grey's Anatomy, for which Chandler received his first Primetime Emmy Award nomination.

Chandler received widespread critical acclaim for his performance as Eric Taylor in Friday Night Lights (2006–11); he received numerous award nominations for his portrayal of the character and won the Primetime Emmy Award for Outstanding Lead Actor in a Drama Series in 2011 for his performance in the show's final season. Chandler's film work has included notable supporting roles in King Kong (2005), The Day the Earth Stood Still (2008), Super 8 (2011), Argo, Zero Dark Thirty (2012), The Wolf of Wall Street (2013), Carol (2015), Manchester by the Sea (2016), Game Night and First Man (2018). He starred as Dr. Mark Russell in Godzilla: King of the Monsters (2019), and Godzilla vs. Kong (2021). Chandler's first starring role on television since the conclusion of Friday Night Lights was as Det. John Rayburn in the Netflix thriller Bloodline (2015–17), for which he received his fourth and fifth Primetime Emmy Award nominations. In 2021, he starred in the crime miniseries Mayor of Kingstown. In November 2022, he appeared as the character Peter in the Netflix film Slumberland.

Early life
Chandler was born in Buffalo, New York, the fourth child of Edward Chandler, a pharmaceutical sales representative, and his wife, Sally Jeanette (née Meyer), a dog breeder. Chandler has three siblings.

Chandler was raised Roman Catholic, although he stopped attending church after his father's death in 1980. He grew up in suburban Lake Forest, Illinois, until he was 11 years old, when his family moved to a small farm in Loganville, Georgia. Chandler's mother raised Great Danes for show dogs; he travelled with his parents to dog shows as a child and helped out at their dog boarding kennel.

Chandler graduated from George Walton Academy in nearby Monroe, Georgia in 1983. As a freshman at Walton, he was a member of the 1979 state championship football team. He left the team the following year, aged 14, after his father died of a heart attack. He participated in the theatre program at Walton after quitting football.

Chandler's widowed mother ran the business, Sheenwater Kennels, to support Chandler and his siblings. She "was highly active with the Great Dane Club of America (GDCA) as a breeder, judge and championship prize winner."

After graduating from high school, Chandler attended the University of Georgia, where he was a drama major and member of the class of 1984 Sigma Nu fraternity. In 1988, seven credits short of a bachelor's degree in drama, Chandler dropped out of college to pursue a television deal.

Career

1988–2006: Early career
In 1988, Chandler was signed by the American Broadcasting Company and brought to Hollywood as part of ABC's new talent program. He made his television film debut that same year as a supporting hero actor in Quiet Victory: The Charlie Wedemeyer Story. Also in 1988, Chandler studied with acting teacher, Milton Katselas. His first major acting experience was a supporting role on television as Army Private William Griner in Tour of Duty. In eight episodes of the last season of the series, he played a member of a special operations squad fighting in Vietnam.

Chandler made his film debut in one of the key roles in the 1992 George Strait film, Pure Country. From 1991 to 1993, he had a series regular role as Cleveland Indians right fielder Jeff Metcalf in the ABC series Homefront, a drama set in the post-World War II era in the fictional town of River Run, Ohio. Homefront ran for two seasons, with Chandler appearing in all 42 episodes.

In 1994, he made his Broadway debut, co-starring with Ashley Judd, in a revival of William Inge's Picnic at the Roundabout Theatre Company. From 1996 to 2000, Chandler starred as the lead character in the CBS series Early Edition, as a man who had the ability to change future disasters. He portrayed bar owner Gary Hobson, a stockbroker turned hero who received "tomorrow's newspaper today", delivered to his door by a mysterious cat. In 1996, he received the Saturn Award for Best Actor on Television for his portrayal of Hobson. Chandler was featured in all 90 episodes of the series, which ran for four seasons. In 2001, he appeared opposite Joan Cusack as investment banker Jake Evans in one season of the ABC comedy series What About Joan.

In 2003, Chandler played scheming lawyer Grant Rashton in six episodes of the short-lived NBC series The Lyon's Den, opposite Rob Lowe. Working again in film, Chandler played the 1930s film star Bruce Baxter in the 2005 film King Kong (the character was based on romantic film star Bruce Cabot, who played Jack Driscoll in the original King Kong). Coincidentally, Chandler later played John Driscoll in The Day the Earth Stood Still.

In February 2006, Chandler returned to television to guest star as the ill-fated bomb squad leader Dylan Young in two episodes of the ABC series Grey's Anatomy. The episodes, titled "It's The End of The World" and "As We Know It", followed Super Bowl XL. He received substantial praise for his performance and was nominated for the Outstanding Guest Actor in a Drama Series category at the 58th Primetime Emmy Awards. He appeared again on Grey's Anatomy, in the February 15, 2007 episode "Drowning On Dry Land", and the February 22, 2007 episode "Some Kind of Miracle".

2006–2011: Friday Night Lights

While working on his Primetime Emmy Award-nominated guest role in Grey's Anatomy, Chandler met Peter Berg, who was developing a drama series Friday Night Lights, which followed the lives of a high school football coach, his family, and the players in a small Texas town. The series was inspired by Buzz Bissinger's book and the film of the same name. Chandler learned that he had been cast as high school football coach Eric Taylor when he was on Christmas vacation in 2005 with his family.

The show's pilot aired on NBC in 2006. While critically acclaimed, the series was at risk of cancellation each year. Starting with the third season in 2008, first-run episodes of the show were broadcast on DirecTV satellite channel The 101 Network before being repeated on NBC. The final season ended in 2011.

Chandler said that neither he nor Berg wanted him to play the role of Coach Taylor. And "while Chandler later changed his mind and decided he would be perfect for the role, Berg didn't see things his way: 'To this day he still says, I still didn't want you.'" Chandler won the Primetime Emmy Award for Outstanding Lead Actor in a Drama Series for his role in the final season of Friday Night Lights.

While shooting the series, Chandler also acted in some films. In 2007, he appeared in The Kingdom, which was directed by Friday Night Lights creator Berg, and in 2008, he appeared in The Day the Earth Stood Still as John Driscoll.

2011–present: Film career and Bloodline

After Friday Night Lights ended, Chandler focused on film work. In 2011, he had a lead role in J. J. Abrams' science fiction film Super 8. The following year, he appeared in Argo. Chandler also co-starred in Kathryn Bigelow's Zero Dark Thirty in 2012, playing the role of Joseph Bradley, an Islamabad CIA Station Chief. He co-starred alongside Jessica Chastain and Jason Clarke.

In 2013, he had a supporting role in Broken City, starring Mark Wahlberg, Russell Crowe, and Catherine Zeta-Jones. Chandler appeared in The Wolf of Wall Street, also released in 2013, based on the memoir of Wall Street tycoon Jordan Belfort. It was nominated for five Academy Awards including Best Picture. The film stars Leonardo DiCaprio and Jonah Hill, with Martin Scorsese directing. Chandler played FBI agent Patrick Denham. That same year, he played a deadbeat alcoholic father in The Spectacular Now.

In 2015, Chandler co-starred in Todd Haynes' drama film Carol, portraying "a jealous husband" to his wife played by Cate Blanchett, who is revealed to be lesbian. Also in 2015, Chandler returned to television with the Netflix drama series Bloodline, for which he was nominated for a Primetime Emmy Award. The show premiered to positive reviews from critics, and ended after airing its third season. In the 2016 drama Manchester by the Sea, he played the main character's older brother.

Chandler played an investigator in Shawn Christensen's film The Vanishing of Sidney Hall (2017), and starred with Rachel McAdams and Jason Bateman in the comedy film Game Night (2018).

In 2019, he starred in Godzilla: King of the Monsters, a role he reprised in 2021's Godzilla vs. Kong. He portrayed Silicon Valley investor Bill Gurley in Showtime's Super Pumped alongside Joseph Gordon-Levitt.

In November 2022, Chandler played Peter in the Netflix film Slumberland alongside Jason Momoa.

Personal life
For nearly 20 years after beginning his acting career in the late 1980s, Chandler lived in Los Angeles. Since 2007, Chandler and his family have lived on a 33-acre spread in Dripping Springs, Texas, southwest of Austin, where they own several dogs and donkeys. Chandler's mother came to live with the family toward the end of her life, when she was living with Alzheimer's disease. She died in 2014.

Chandler serves as a volunteer firefighter. He also participates in an annual charity golf tournament at Wolfdancer Golf Club (in Lost Pines, TX) to raise funds for football players who have spinal cord injuries.

Chandler has been married to Kathryn Macquarrie since 1995. Chandler met his wife at a dog park in the mid-1990s. They have two daughters, Sydney, who is an actress, and Sawyer. Chandler and his daughter Sawyer have been active in trying to end the practice of shark finning.

Filmography

Film

Television

Video games

Theater
 Picnic (1994) at Criterion Center Stage Right, as Hal Carter

Awards and nominations

References

External links

 
 

1965 births
20th-century American male actors
21st-century American male actors
Living people
American male film actors
American male television actors
American male voice actors
American people of English descent
American people of German descent
American people of Irish descent
Male actors from Georgia (U.S. state)
Male actors from Texas
Outstanding Performance by a Lead Actor in a Drama Series Primetime Emmy Award winners
Outstanding Performance by a Cast in a Motion Picture Screen Actors Guild Award winners
People from Loganville, Georgia
People from Dripping Springs, Texas